Kenkai (born 1107 (Kajō 2) in Kii Province – died 11 June 1155 (Kyūju 2)) was a later Heian period Bhikku of Shingon Buddhism.

Kenkai studied under Kakuban at Mount Kōya, became one of the main family of teachers and received the abhisheka from Shinyo.

1107 births
1155 deaths
Japanese Buddhist clergy
Shingon Buddhist monks
Heian period Buddhist clergy